Vocabularies (stylized as VOCAbuLarieS) is a studio album by American jazz vocalist Bobby McFerrin that was recorded with composer Roger Treece and released on April 6, 2010 by EmArcy in the United States. Described on McFerrin's website as "music for the 21st century", the album took seven years to make with over 1,400 vocal tracks recorded by over 50 singers in order to form a "virtual choir".

The album received critical acclaim from critics for its ambition and musical complexity.

Track listing

Critical response
Vocabularies received critical acclaim from critics. Thom Jurek of AllMusic gave the album four and a half out of five stars, writing that it is "easily McFerrin’s finest moment on record as well as his most ambitious, and should win him some new fans even among cynics." Mark F. Turner of All About Jazz gave the album five out of five stars, stating that it is McFerrin's "most challenging release to date" for his attempt to collaborate with 50 singers over seven years to create a virtual choir, with every song "defined by their playfulness and infectious rhythms, as well as their unique vocalizations and interplay." Ryan Reed of PopMatters gave a highly positive review of the album, considering it to be McFerrin's first album to "have truly captured the full scope and spirit of McFerrin's abilities and eclecticism", writing further that it is "a testament to both McFerrin's long-underrated abilities, and the sheer expansiveness and possibilities of the human voice.

John Eyles of the BBC emphasized that Vocabularies is not only Mcferrin's most ambitious project, "it is also one of the most complex albums ever constructed", and that "[t]he end result has that wow factor which signals an instant classic". Allan McFarlane of AudioEnz (StereoNET Australia) gave high praises for the album's "startling[ly]" unique arrangements and meticulous construction, writing that it is "as ambitious as it is successful, bringing three decades of experience and often experimental music making to this culmination of a lifetime[']s artistic endeavour."

Personnel
 Bobby McFerrin – vocals
 Roger Treece – vocals, synthesizer programming
 Alex Acuña – percussion
 Sandra Anderson - vocals
 Sandy Anderson - vocals
 Ryland Angel - vocals
 Thom Baker - vocals
 Joey Blake - vocals
 Theo Bleckmann - vocals
 Kristina Boerger - vocals
 Everett Bradley - vocals
 Lincoln Briney - vocals
 Katie Campbell - vocals
 Bonnie Denise Christansen - vocals
 Pierre Cook - vocals
 Cole Davis - vocals
 Daniel Abraham DeVeau - vocals
 Sussan Deyhim - vocals
 Judi Donaghy - vocals
 Michele Eaton - vocals
 Gary Eckert - vocals
 Rosana Eckert - vocals
 Peter Eldridge - vocals
 Elizabeth Farnum - vocals
 Andrea Figallo - vocals
 Lisa Fischer - vocals
 La Tanya Hall - vocals
 Albert Hera - vocals
 Datevik Hovanesian - vocals
 Aubrey Johnson - vocals
 Mark Johnson - vocals
 Curtis King - vocals
 Lauren Kinhan - vocals
 Josephine Lee - vocals
 Darmon Meader - vocals
 Alexandra Montano - vocals
 Gayla Morgan - vocals
 Kim Nazarian - vocals
 Kevin Osborne - vocals
 Darren Percival - vocals
 Beth Quist - vocals
 Rhiannon - vocals
 David Root - vocals
 Marlon Saunders - vocals
 Fletcher Sheridan - vocals
 Janis Siegel - vocals
 Richard Slade - vocals
 Luciana Souza - vocals
 Michael Steinberger - vocals
 Darryl Tookes - vocals
 Roger Treece - vocals
 Michelle Mailhot Vines - vocals
 Amelia Watkins - vocals
 Michele Weir - vocals
 David B. Whitworth - vocals
 Dave Worm - vocals

References

2010 albums
Bobby McFerrin albums
Vocal jazz albums